Gluta laccifera is a tree species in the family Anacardiaceae.  It can be found in Indo-China and in Viet Nam it may be called sơn tiên or sơn huyết; no subspecies are listed in the Catalogue of Life.

References

Anacardiaceae
Flora of Indo-China